Enneapterygius kermadecensis, the Kermadec triplefin, is a fish species in the family Tripterygiidae, found in tidal rock pools around the Kermadec Islands in the southwest Pacific Ocean.  Its length is up to 3.3 cm.

References

kermadecensis
Endemic marine fish of New Zealand
Fauna of the Kermadec Islands
Fish described in 1994
Taxa named by Ronald Fricke